Endothia is a genus of fungi within the family Cryphonectriaceae.

Species
Endothia daldiniana
Endothia fluens
Endothia hypocreoides
Endothia japonica
Endothia macrospora
Endothia metrosideri
Endothia nitschkei
Endothia paraguayensis
Endothia parasitica - see below
Endothia passeriniana
Endothia pseudoradicalis
Endothia radicalis
Endothia singularis
Endothia tephrothele
Endothia tetraspora
Endothia virginiana
Endothia viridistroma

See also

 Cryphonectria parasitica, formerly Endothia parasitica, severe blight of the American chestnut tree Castanea dentata

External links

Sordariomycetes genera
Diaporthales